Robert W. Dean (June 11, 1923 – November 10, 1987) was an American judge and legislator from Wisconsin.

Biography
Born in Tomahawk, Wisconsin, Dean received his bachelor's degree and law degrees from the University of Wisconsin–Madison. During World War II, he served in the United States Army Air Forces. After college, he moved to Wausau, Wisconsin to practice law. From 1959 to 1962, he served in the Wisconsin State Senate and in 1962 was appointed a Wisconsin Circuit Court judge. From 1978 until his retirement in 1986, he served in the Wisconsin Court of Appeals.

Notes

People from Tomahawk, Wisconsin
Politicians from Wausau, Wisconsin
United States Army Air Forces soldiers
Military personnel from Wisconsin
University of Wisconsin Law School alumni
Wisconsin state court judges
Wisconsin Court of Appeals judges
Wisconsin state senators
1923 births
1999 deaths
20th-century American judges
20th-century American politicians
United States Army Air Forces personnel of World War II